Jakub Kuzdra (born 8 December 1997) is a Polish professional footballer who plays as a full-back for I liga side Chrobry Głogów.

Club career

Volos 
On 10 July 2021, Greek Super League club Volos announced the signing of Kuzdra, who was released from Warta Poznań. He made a single cup appearance before terminating his contract by mutual consent on 15 December 2021.

Chrobry Głogów 
On 10 June 2022, Kuzdra joined I liga side Chrobry Głogów on a two-year deal.

References

External links
 
 

1997 births
Living people
Association football fullbacks
Polish footballers
Poland youth international footballers
Ekstraklasa players
I liga players
II liga players
Piast Gliwice players
Polonia Bytom players
Bytovia Bytów players
Unia Tarnów players
Warta Poznań players
Volos N.F.C. players
Chrobry Głogów players
Polish expatriate footballers
Expatriate footballers in Greece
Polish expatriate sportspeople in Greece
Sportspeople from Tarnów